Ezéchiel Nibigira is the current Minister of Foreign Affairs of the Republic of Burundi. He was previously Ambassador of Burundi in Kenya and leader of the youth wing of Burundi's ruling party CNDD-FDD. He was also a Member of Parliament representing Bujumbura rural where he chaired Burundi's parliament's Finance committee. Prior to his current post Nibigira was head of Burundi's customs as well as imports and exports. During President Pierre Nkurunziza's 2010 elections campaign, Nibigira was a chief campaign manager. Nibigira earned a Bachelor of Arts degree in Business from Hope Africa University.

References

Living people
National Council for the Defense of Democracy – Forces for the Defense of Democracy politicians
Year of birth missing (living people)
Foreign ministers of Burundi
Ambassadors of Burundi to Kenya
Members of the National Assembly (Burundi)